Britt Mjaasund Øyen (born 7 September 1944) is a Norwegian known for medals in Ice sledge speed racing at the Winter Paralympics. Øyen also won Paralympic medals in cross-country skiing (1980) and Ice sledge hockey (1994). She received the Erling Stordahls ærespris in 2012.

References

External links 
 

1944 births
Living people
Norwegian sledge hockey players
Paralympic ice sledge speed racers of Norway
Paralympic sledge hockey players of Norway
Paralympic gold medalists for Norway
Paralympic silver medalists for Norway
Paralympic medalists in ice sledge speed racing
Ice sledge speed racers at the 1980 Winter Paralympics
Medalists at the 1984 Winter Paralympics
Ice sledge hockey players at the 1994 Winter Paralympics
Medalists at the 1994 Winter Paralympics
20th-century Norwegian women
21st-century Norwegian women